Why Women Love (also known as Sea Woman) is a 1925 American silent drama film produced and directed by Edwin Carewe and distributed by First National Pictures. Blanche Sweet starred in the film which was based on the Broadway play The Sea Woman, by Willard Robertson.

Plot
As described in a film magazine review, a young woman whose lover is a sea captain is reported lost at sea when fire destroys her father’s ship. In reality, the young woman has been rescued and has undertaken to care for the daughter of her rescuer, who was a lighthouse keeper. After a series of thrilling adventures revolving around the lighthouse keeper’s daughter, the young woman and her lover are reunited.

Cast

Production
The film's working title was Barriers Aflame. An alternative title was The Sea Woman. The film was shot on location at Point Lobos in Monterey County, California.

Preservation
Why Women Love is now considered lost.

References

External links
 
 

1925 films
1925 drama films
Silent American drama films
American silent feature films
American black-and-white films
American films based on plays
Films directed by Edwin Carewe
Films shot in California
First National Pictures films
Lost American films
1925 lost films
Lost drama films
1920s American films